Pokemouche Airport  is located in Village-Blanchard,  north of Pokemouche, New Brunswick, Canada.

References

External links
Page about this airport on COPA's Places to Fly airport directory

Registered aerodromes in New Brunswick
Transport in Gloucester County, New Brunswick
Buildings and structures in Gloucester County, New Brunswick